Sevier may refer to:

Sevier, Utah
Sevier County, Tennessee
Sevier County, Utah
Sevier County, Arkansas
Sevier River 
Sevier orogeny

See also
 Sevier (surname)